Svalbard are an English post-hardcore band from Bristol, formed in 2011. Following early material (compiled on the album Discography 2012–2014) they have released three studio albums: One Day All This Will End (2015), It's Hard to Have Hope (2018), When I Die, Will I Get Better? (2020). Their style integrates hardcore punk, post-rock, and melodic black metal.

History 
Svalbard's first release was a self-titled EP released on 29 March 2012. It was re-released on 1 November 2013 after being remixed and remastered by Patrick W. Engel at Temple of Disharmony, who also mixed and mastered two further EPs that the band released that year, Gone Tomorrow and Flightless Birds. Ever since these early releases, the band has toured often in the UK and Europe. On 7 July 2014, their split album with Pariso, with cover art by Daniel P. Carter, was released through multiple record labels (Tangled Talk in the UK, Holy Ground in the US, Swarm of Nails in France, Through Love in Germany and Smithsfoodgroup in the Netherlands). This was followed by the band's debut studio album, One Day All This Will End, which was recorded and mixed by Lewis Johns and released on 25 September 2015 through Holy Roar Records. Through Love handled the release in Germany and Halo of Flies in the US. Music videos were released for the tracks "Disparity" and "Expect Equal Respect", the latter advocating for the acceptance of women within extreme music without treating them as anomalies.

On 28 October 2016, Discography 2012–2014, a compilation album of all 15 songs that Svalbard recorded before their debut album, remastered by Brad Boatright, was released by Holy Roar in conjunction with Through Love and Halo of Flies. A split EP with the Tidal Sleep featuring one new song from each band followed on 15 January 2017; a music video for Svalbard's side of the split, "Open the Cages", was released on 12 November 2016. On 25 May 2018, they released their second studio album It's Hard to Have Hope.

In early July 2020 the band announced their third studio album When I Die, Will I Get Better? for a mid September release through their long time label Holy Roar, however a week before the album's planned release the band severed their ties and associations with Holy Roar due to the recent sexual misconduct allegations against its founder Alex Fitzpatrick. The band subsequently announced they signed with Church Road Records and would release the album with them on September 25th, as well as arrange refunds for people who preordered the album through Holy Roar. Metal Hammer named it as the 5th best metal album of 2020.

Musical style 
On their Bandcamp, Svalbard place their work within the general categories of alternative, post-metal, post-hardcore, black metal, metal, and occasionally post-rock and hardcore. Their previous label, Holy Roar Records, described them as combining "post-hardcore, crust/d-beat, post-rock and black metal atmospherics and intensity" as well as drawing "musical influence from crust, post-rock and hardcore ... and lyrical influence from early 20th century existentialism". They have also been described as: an "archetypal 2010s post-hardcore band" by Drowned in Sound; performing "melodic hardcore, with dramatic overtones of post-rock and black metal" by Bristol 24/7; performing "atmospheric hardcore" which blends "Explosions in the Sky influenced post metal ... [with] harsher and more aggressive aspects" by AveNoctum.com; and "one of the brightest sparks in UK hardcore" by Metal Hammer. In a positive review of One Day All This Will End, Echoes and Dust called it "a swirling mixture of hardcore, metal, crust, black metal and post-rock". Rating their performance in London in August 2015 4/5, OneMetal.com wrote: "The [band's] Isis-inspired nuances feel all the more cathartic when paired with the blasts of harsh, mournful riffs, reminiscent of Modern Life Is War."

Members 
Serena Cherry – guitar, lead vocals, lyrics
Mark Lilley – drums
Matt Francis – bass
Liam Phelan – guitar, co-lead vocals

Discography 
Studio albums
One Day All This Will End (2015)
It's Hard to Have Hope (2018)
When I Die, Will I Get Better? (2020)

Compilation albums
Discography 2012–2014 (2016)
 
EPs
Svalbard (2012)
Gone Tomorrow (2013)
Flightless Birds (2013)

Splits
Cover Buzz (with Pariso, Let It Die, Mine) (2013)
Pariso / Svalbard (2014)
Svalbard / The Tidal Sleep (2017)

References

External links 
Svalbard on Bandcamp

British crust and d-beat groups
Post-hardcore groups
English heavy metal musical groups
Post-metal musical groups
English post-rock groups
Melodic hardcore groups
English black metal musical groups
Musical groups from Bristol
2011 establishments in England
Musical groups established in 2011